14th century
Stephen of Perm

18th century
Cosmas of Aetolia
Philothei (Leschinsky) of Tobolsk and All Siberia

18th-19th century
Herman of Alaska
Iakinf (Bichurin) of Beijing

19th century
Innocent of Alaska
Jacob Netsvetov
Pallady (Kafarov) of Beijing

19th-20th century
Innocent (Figurovsky) of Beijing
Raphael Morgan
Nicholas of Japan
Theoclitos (Triantafilides)

20th century
Alexei (Kabaliuk) of Carpathia
Anastasios (Yannoulatos) of Albania
Chrysostomos Papasarantopoulos
Jonah of Manchuria
Makarios (Tillyrides) of Kenya
Patriarch Peter VII of Alexandria

21st century
Daniil Sysoev

List
Missionaries
Eastern Orthodox